Fundella ahemora is a species of snout moth in the genus Fundella. It was described by Harrison Gray Dyar Jr. in 1914, and is known from Mexico, Guatemala, and Costa Rica.

References

Moths described in 1914
Phycitinae